Terence Michael Cordaroy (born 26 May 1944) is a former English cricketer.  Cordaroy was a right-handed batsman.  He was born in Hampstead, London.

Cordaroy made his first-class debut for Middlesex in the 1968 County Championship against Leicestershire.  It was on debut that he scored his only first-class half century, making 81 runs in the Middlesex first-innings.  He played his second and final first-class match in that same season against Surrey.  In his two first-class matches, he scored 104 runs at a batting average of 34.66.

He later joined Buckinghamshire, making his debut for the county in the 1977 Minor Counties Championship against Hertfordshire.  Cordaroy played Minor counties cricket for Buckinghamshire from 1977 to 1979, which included 22 Minor Counties Championship matches.  In 1979, he played in his only List A match, against Suffolk in the Gillette Cup.  In this match he scored 44 runs before being run out.

References

External links
Terence Cordaroy at ESPNcricinfo
Terence Cordaroy at CricketArchive

1944 births
Living people
People from Hampstead
Cricketers from Greater London
English cricketers
Middlesex cricketers
Buckinghamshire cricketers